This is a list of Tracking and Data Relay Satellites. TDRS spacecraft are all in geostationary orbit and are operated by the United States National Aeronautics and Space Administration, and are used for communication between NASA facilities and spacecraft, including the Space Shuttle, Hubble Space Telescope, and International Space Station.

As of 1 March 2019, 12 of the TDRS satellites launched were operational, two (TDRS-3, TDRS-5) had been placed in storage, two (TDRS-1 and TDRS-4) had been retired, and one (TDRS-B) had been lost in a launch failure.

Satellites

References

TDRS
Tracking and Data Relay Satellite